Glasgow Mets – Scottish volleyball club from Glasgow. Originally from Blantyre, now based at St Mungo's Academy.  is one of the most developed clubs in the whole of Scotland. The club use to play in 5 different Scottish divisions including the only sitting volleyball team in Scotland. Currently Mets have two men teams playing in division one and division two.

Glasgow Mets I national competitions

Glasgow Mets I Squad 
 Coach:  Mark Hudson
 Assistant Coach:  Andrew Fleming

Glasgow Mets II Squad 
 Coach:  Mark Hudson
 Assistant Coach:  Andrew Fleming

International Competitions

Glasgow Mets II National Competitions 

Scottish volleyball clubs
Sports teams in Glasgow